Linguaskill is an online, multilevel test provided by Cambridge Assessment English. It is used by Higher Education Institutions and employers who need a fast, accurate way to check the English language skills of students and employees. The test is modular so institutions and employers can choose the combination of language skills they want to assess.

The Linguaskill Reading and Listening module is a computer-adaptive test. The test finishes when a candidate has answered enough questions for Linguaskill to identify their level accurately. Answers are marked automatically to provide fast, accurate results.

History
The development of the first computer-assessment English language test by Cambridge English dates back to the early 1990s.

The employment agency Manpower approached Cambridge Assessment English in 1994 with a request for a language proficiency test to be used to place staff in temporary employment. The test requirements were as follows: 
 it could be administered at any office
 it could be available on demand
 it did not require specially qualified staff to mark it
 it had to be short, yet as reliable as possible
 it had to accurately identify candidates’ practical language ability in a general business setting.

Given these requirements, computer-adaptive testing was identified as the most suitable approach. It satisfied the need for a relatively short test, which would measure accurately over a wide range of levels, and it would be convenient to administer.

The original Linguaskill ran under DOS. By 1996, it had been replaced by a Windows multimedia version. It was trialled in a number of countries mostly in Europe, but also in Mexico and Japan.

Having successfully demonstrated the use of computer-adaptive testing, a number of further testing projects were undertaken. These have included: CommuniCAT (winner of the 2000 European Academic Software Award), computer-based BULATS Online and the Cambridge English Placement Test.

In 2016, the new version of Linguaskill was launched.  It has been trialled by speakers of over 40 languages, from 50 countries around the world, to ensure the accuracy and reliability of results.

Format
Linguaskill is a computer-based test. It requires a computer, internet connection and a set of headphones (no specialist software is required). It is a modular assessment which tests Reading and Listening (combined) and Writing.

Reading and Listening (60–85 minutes)

The Reading and Listening module is an adaptive test. There is not a fixed number of questions. The test finishes when the candidate has answered enough questions  for Linguaskill to identify the candidate’s level accurately.

Writing (45 minutes)

The Writing test has two parts (each worth half of the final Writing mark).

Part 1: the candidate needs to write an email (minimum of 50 words).

Part 2: the candidate needs to write a longer text (minimum of 180 words).

Example writing topics include: future plans; free time and hobbies; using and learning English; family and friends; travel and holidays; places and sights; studying and working; shopping; sport; music; home life; technology.

Candidates input their answers using a computer keyboard.

Timing and results
Linguaskill does not have any set test dates or venues. It is designed for organisations that wish to run and invigilate the test at their own site, according to their own timescales.

Results for the Reading and Listening module are provided immediately. Writing answers are marked automatically by the computer and results are available within 12 hours.

Linguaskill has a computer-generated Test Report Form. This means there is no waiting for printed certificates/documents.

The Test Report Form has the following information about the candidate’s performance:
 a CEFR  level for each skill tested (writing, reading and listening)
 a score on the Cambridge English Scale for each skill tested (writing, reading and listening)
 an average CEFR score (if more than one skill is tested)
 an average Cambridge English Scale score (if more than one skill is tested)
 an explanation of what each score means in terms of English language ability.

The following scores are used to report results:

Test reports can be produced for individuals or for groups. It is possible to break down scores by group and language level. This is designed to allow for easy comparison of language ability across a whole organisation.

Usage
Linguaskill is used by Higher Education Institutions to assess language levels on admissions, monitor progress, and check that students meet graduation language requirements. 
 
Linguaskill is used by employers in recruitment to check applicants have the right language skills for a role. It is also used to measure the effectiveness of staff language training.

The test is modular. Each organisation chooses the combination of language skills to be tested. Linguaskill has a flexible structure, so that organisations can administer it however, wherever and whenever is convenient for their exact needs.

Preparation
Free preparation materials, such as sample tests, are available online.

See also
Cambridge Assessment English

References

English language skills

External links
Official website

Standardized tests for English language
English language tests
English-language education
University of Cambridge examinations